Puerto Umbria is a settlement in Villagarzón Municipality, Putumayo Department Department in Colombia.

Climate
Puerto Umbria has a tropical rainforest climate (Af) with heavy to very heavy rainfall year-round.

References

Populated places in the Putumayo Department